Hacı is the Turkish spelling of the title and epithet Hajji. It may refer to:

People
 Hacı I Giray (died 1466), founder and the first ruler of the Crimean Khanate
 Hacı Ahmet ( 1566), purported Turkish cartographer
 Hacı Arif Bey (1831–1885), Turkish composer
 Hacı Arif Örgüç (1876–1940), Ottoman and Turkish military officer
 Hacı Bayram-ı Veli (1352–1430), Turkish poet
 Hacı Halil Efendi (died 1821), Ottoman Sheikh ul-Islam
 Hacı İlbey ( 1305–1371), Ottoman military commander
 Hacı İvaz Mehmet Pasha (died 1743), Ottoman grand vizier
 Hacı Karay (1950–1994), Turkish drug trafficker
 Hacı Mehmet Zorlu (1919–2005), Turkish businessman
 Hacı Ömer Sabancı (1906–1966), Turkish entrepreneur, founder of Sabancı Holding
 Hacı Sabancı (1935–1998), Turkish businessman, his son
 Hacı Pasha ( 1348–1349), Ottoman grand vizier

See also 
 Hacı, İpsala
 Hajji (name)

Turkish masculine given names